Halkirk is a village on the River Thurso in Caithness, in the Highland council area of Scotland. From Halkirk the B874 road runs towards Thurso in the north and towards Georgemas in the east. The village is within the parish of Halkirk, and is said by locals to be Scotland's first planned village.

Cathedral
It was at one time the site of the cathedral of the Diocese of Caithness. In the early 13th century, a revolt against the tithe, imposed by the Bishop, lead the local husbandmen to lay siege to the cathedral kitchen, and burn it down, with Adam of Melrose, the Bishop, still inside. Adam's successor Gilbert de Moravia moved the seat of the Diocese to Dornoch, and there are no remains of the Halkirk cathedral church or the bishop's seat.

Historic distilleries
Halkirk has had two whisky distilleries, Gerston from 1796 to 1885, and Ben Morven (also known as Gerston II) from 1886 to circa 1911. Both were established on the banks of the River Thurso, near Gerston Farm, and both drew water from Calder Burn. The Ben Morven distillery was named for the mountain, the highest point in Caithness.

The original Gerston distillery was first registered by a Francis Swanson, and was expanded by two sons, John and James, in 1825. Sir Robert Peel is said to have acquired a taste for the whisky. The distillery closed not long after it was sold to new owners in 1872, and a London company, calling themselves the Gerston Distillery Company, decided to build a new distillery.

In 1897 the new distillery was sold to Northern Distilleries Limited, who gave it the Ben Morven name. It was never very successful, and it closed circa 1911. The stillhouse is still standing.

Fairview House
Fairview House is a former poorhouse dating from 1856, which is now a residential complex.

Notable residents
Halkirk is the birthplace of Alexander Keith (1795–1873), who settled in Halifax, Nova Scotia and became established as a respected politician and brewer. He is known across Canada for his most famous beer, Alexander Keith's India Pale Ale.

Prof John Malcolm FRSE (1873–1954) was also born and raised in Halkirk.

Gallery

References

Notes
 Ordnance Survey grid reference for Halkirk Bridge: 
 Ordnance Survey grid reference for Gerston Farm:

External links

Halkirk community website
Halkirk Parish Church

Populated places in Caithness
Parishes in Caithness